Flower Hill Village Hall is the administrative headquarters for the Incorporated Village of Flower Hill, New York. It houses the Village of Flower Hill's government, along with the village's service and maintenance vehicles.

Description 
The building is located at 1 Bonnie Heights Road, on a  plot of land, directly across the street from the Flower Hill Village Park. This property used to be the location of the real estate office of Carlos Munson – a prominent, early Flower Hill resident and the former chairman of the Munson Steamship Company.

In addition to holding village elections, Flower Hill Village Hall is also the polling location for voters residing in New York State Assembly district 16's election districts 59, 60, and 61 during general elections.

Village Hall is also the location where the Nassau County Police Department's RMPs 607 and 610, which service Flower Hill, change tours.

History 
In a February, 1948 referendum vote, the voters of Flower Hill approved the construction of a new village hall. Designed by Roslyn architect Henry W. Johanson in the colonial architectural style, it includes a clerks room, meeting room, and entrance hall, as well as a garage for Flower Hill's service vehicles. Construction on Village Hall commenced in July 1948. The building was constructed by New York City-based Robert Johnson, Inc. for a cost of $60,000 (1948 USD).

The first meeting to be held within the building by Flower Hill's Board of Trustees took place on February 24, 1949, and the Board of Trustees directed that the significance of the occasion be noted within the minutes of that meeting.

Additionally, Trustee Harry Vaubel gifted a flag and flag pole to the Village of Flower Hill; this gift coincided with the opening of Village Hall.

On April 28 1956, the local Garden Liaison Committee planted two dogwood trees on the property as a means of expressing their gratitude to the village's officials for letting them conduct their meetings within the building.

Coffee & donut controversy, 1951 
In 1951, a contentious debate took place regarding the serving of coffee and donuts at Village Hall. Residents and members of local civic associations – notably the Flower Hill Association and the Flower Hill Women's Club – were divided over whether or not such items should be served at meetings within the building, and played a major role in the outcome of the Village's 1951 elections.

The debate started when trustees denied the local civic associations the ability to serve these items at their meetings, and the Flower Hill Association nominated two candidates to oust the trustees who were opposed to allowing these items to be served.

Garden dedication, 1996 
In 1996, in light of the sudden passing of Village Clerk Barbara Errett, the Village of Flower Hill dedicated the garden in front of the building in her honor. The plantings were donated by the family of Mayor John Walter.

2000s renovations 
The building was renovated during the 2000s, during the tenure of Mayor Charles Weiss.

References

External links 
Flower Hill village website

Flower Hill, New York

Village halls in the United States